Marc Preston Webb (born August 31, 1974) is an American music video director and filmmaker. Webb made his feature film directorial debut in 2009 with the romantic comedy 500 Days of Summer, and went on to direct The Amazing Spider-Man in 2012, which was later dubbed as the "Webb-Verse" by Marvel Studios in 2021. He also directed the drama films Gifted and The Only Living Boy in New York.

Early life
Webb was born in Bloomington, Indiana, the son of Margaret Ruth (née Stocker) and Norman Lott Webb, who works in math education at the University of Wisconsin. When he was eighteen months old, Webb's family moved to Madison, Wisconsin, where he was raised. He graduated from Madison West High School in 1992, and subsequently attended Colorado College, and the University of Wisconsin–Madison, from which he graduated with an English degree.

Career
Webb began his trade as an editor before turning his hand to directing music videos. He told The Daily Beast: "The very first video I did was for a band called The Shame Idols in Birmingham, Alabama, and I paid for it on a credit card and my mom loaned me about $500 to finish it. It was actually about a superhero—a Catwoman-y type of thing. This woman who sewed the costume together, and we shot it on 16mm film. You can't see it anywhere and it's not on YouTube—and I'm glad it's not. The first video that got shown was a Blues Traveler video called "Canadian Rose," but I just did the concept stuff for it. Between 1999 and 2009, he directed videos for the likes of Good Charlotte, Evanescence, AFI, 3 Doors Down, Green Day, My Chemical Romance and Snow Patrol.

His feature-length debut, 500 Days of Summer, starring Joseph Gordon-Levitt and Zooey Deschanel, was released in July 2009 to a positive critical reception. In January 2010, Columbia Pictures hired Webb to direct The Amazing Spider-Man, a reboot of the Spider-Man film franchise, released in July 2012 and starring Andrew Garfield and Emma Stone. He returned to direct the sequel, The Amazing Spider-Man 2, which was released on May 2, 2014. Developing the 2021 Marvel Cinematic Universe (MCU) film Spider-Man: No Way Home for Marvel Studios, Chris McKenna and Erik Sommers officially dubbed the fictional universe of Webb's Spider-Man films as the Webb-Verse in his honor. In November 2021, it was also revealed that he, along with Sam Raimi, were brought on as creative consultants for the film. 

In 2015, Webb directed promotional ads for a partnership between Samsung and Avengers: Age of Ultron.

Webb is signed to DNA in Hollywood, California, and Academy Productions Ltd in the United Kingdom.

In February 2019, he signed on to direct the live-action reimagined version of the 2016 Japanese anime film Your Name  before he was replaced on September 18, 2020 by Lee Isaac Chung. In May 2019, it was announced that Webb will direct a live-action adaptation of Disney's Snow White and the Seven Dwarfs. 

In 2013, Christopher Keyser and Webb pitched the mystery drama The Society to Showtime, but the network later decided to pass on the series. Netflix turned the pitch into a series instead; created by Keyser and executive produced by both Keyser and Webb, The Society premiered on May 10, 2019.  In July 2019, it was announced that Webb and his Black Lamb production company signed a deal with ABC Studios. In March 2022, Webb signed on to direct the supernatural thriller Day Drinker, written by Zach Dean.

Personal life 
On June 8, 2018, Webb's girlfriend Jane Herman gave birth to a daughter, Georgia. The couple married on October 4, 2019. A son, Walter, was born on April 5, 2021.

Webb's lamb

Webb's signature is a white lamb, which has appeared in a few of his videos. In Brand New's "Sic Transit Gloria... Glory Fades" video, the lamb appears on the door before Jesse Lacey enters the bar. It also appears on the shirt of a girl in the bar. In Yellowcard's "Ocean Avenue" and "Rough Landing, Holly" videos, the lamb appears on the briefcase Ryan Key carries around.

Filmography
Film

 500 Days of Summer (2009)
 The Amazing Spider-Man (2012)
 The Amazing Spider-Man 2 (2014)
 Gifted (2017)
 The Only Living Boy in New York (2017)
 Snow White (2024)

Television

Music videos

Editor videography
MxPx – "Everything Sucks (When You're Gone)" (November 2003)
Brand New – "Sic Transit Gloria.... Glory Fades" (December 2003)

References

External links

Marc Webb at MVDbase.com
Die Musik Video Datenbank (German)

1974 births
American music video directors
American television directors
Colorado College alumni
Action film directors
Living people
People from Bloomington, Indiana
Artists from Madison, Wisconsin
University of Wisconsin–Madison School of Education alumni
Film directors from Indiana
Film directors from Wisconsin
Madison West High School alumni
Television producers from Indiana